Haplotaxis is a genus of annelids belonging to the family Haplotaxidae.

The genus has cosmopolitan distribution.

Species:

Haplotaxis acystis 
Haplotaxis aedeochaeta 
Haplotaxis ascaridoides 
Haplotaxis bretscheri 
Haplotaxis carnivorus 
Haplotaxis dubius 
Haplotaxis emissarius 
Haplotaxis gastrochaetus

References

Annelids